Saffron is a collaborative studio album by Canadian hip hop artist Ron Contour (Moka Only) and Canadian producer Factor. It was released on Fake Four Inc. in 2010. The album is entirely produced by Factor and guest appearances include Def 3.

Release 
In the upcoming and following months to the album's release, music videos for "Wondrous Things", "Confused Nougat" and "Glad" were released via Fake Four Inc's YouTube page.

Background 
Throughout Saffron, Moka Only plays the role of Ron Contour, one of his alter egos, who was initially conceived in 2001 on Moka Only is... Ron Contour. Ron Contour's character is the cousin of Moka Only and is often described as "light hearted" and having a "humorous aura." When asked on the character's purpose to Moka Only, he said: "Ron Contour was completely just for a laugh, not to be taken seriously."

Track listing

References

External links
 
 Saffron at Bandcamp

2010 albums
Collaborative albums
Fake Four Inc. albums
Moka Only albums
Albums produced by Factor (producer)